The 1995–96 Wessex Football League was the tenth season of the Wessex Football League. The league champions for the first time in their history were Thatcham Town, but there was no promotion to the Southern League. Swanage Town & Herston finished bottom and were relegated.

For sponsorship reasons, the league was known as the Jewson Wessex League.

League table
The league consisted of one division of 21 clubs, reduced from 22 the previous season, after Fleet Town were promoted to the Southern League, Horndean were relegated and one new club joined:
Whitchurch United, rejoining from the Hampshire League after being relegated in 1994.

References

Wessex Football League seasons
9